One Plus One Equals Three is a 1927 German silent film directed by Felix Basch and starring Veit Harlan, Georg Alexander, and Claire Rommer.

The film's art direction was by Heinrich Richter.

Cast
Veit Harlan as Paul
Georg Alexander as Peter
Claire Rommer as Anni
Gyula Szőreghy as Annis Vater
Margarete Kupfer as Annis Mutter
Sig Arno as Doktor Planer
Karl Platen as Diener
Lissy Arna

References

External links

Films of the Weimar Republic
Films directed by Felix Basch
German silent feature films
German black-and-white films